Joe Chung (born 1960s) is a writer and political commentator from Hong Kong, who lives in Stavanger, Norway. He is known for his best-seller books I Don't Want to be Chinese Again and China is Stranger than Fiction, severely criticizing Chinese culture, both of which garnered support in Hong Kong and Taiwan.

Life and career
Joe Chung was born in the 1960s in Hong Kong. He became concerned with Chinese politics following the imprisonment of Wei Jingsheng in 1979. In 1991 he completed his master's degree in sociology at Chinese University of Hong Kong. In the elections of 1994 and 1999 for the District Councils of Hong Kong (known as District Boards before 1997), he represented the Hong Kong Democratic Party in the geographical constituency of Wong Tai Sin but was not elected. In 2001 he openly called for independence of Taiwan and was criticised by the Chinese Communist Party as "more arrogant than Taiwan separatists". He is a frequent contributor to Hong Kong Open magazine. In 2012 he contributed several articles to the Apple Daily regarding National Education in Hong Kong and the sovereignty of the Senkaku Islands, also known as Diaoyu Island in People's Republic of China.

Political activism

In a 1990s, Joe Chung was frequently active in pro-democratic approach human rights activities in Hong Kong. On 9 July 1995, Joe Chung and other activists burnt the flag of the People's Republic of China outside the offices of Xinhua in Hong Kong to protest the arrest by the Chinese authorities of Harry Wu, the Chinese penal colony researcher. 
On 30 November 1995, Wei Jingsheng Action Group chairman Joe Chung, accompanied by other members of the Wei Jingsheng Action Group, publicly burned a cartoon image of Chinese Communist leader Deng Xiaoping to demand the release of democracy campaigner Wei Jingsheng. The event occurred outside the office of the Xinhua News Agency in Happy Valley on Thursday, 29 November 1995. Both these events were widely reported by local media and news agencies the following day.

Taiwan independence controversy
On 4 May 2000, (the anniversary of the 4 May movement), Joe Chung published an op-ed piece in the Hong Kong Ming Pao, titled "Taiwan Has the Right to Independence". An article in the Sing Tao published in Hong Kong on 20 May 2000 titled "" (Joe Chung accused of inciting break-up of China as Communist newspapers bombard the Ming Pao) commented on the following events.  According to the article, the Communist affiliated Hong Kong newspapers Ta Kung Pao and Wen Wei Po responded to Joe Chung's article with a barrage of over 20 articles in the following days with articles such as "Taiwan Has No Right to Independence" in the Wen Wei Po on 9 May 2000. The articles refuted Chung's arguments, accusing him of "splitting China", "contravening article 23 of the Basic Law", and being a "traitor" to China. They also attacked the Ming Pao, accusing it of breaking its promise to "publish a Chinese newspaper for Chinese people".
Sing Tao Daily noted that concerted, sustained attacks by the Communist press of this ferocity had not been seen since the pre-handover 1990s when the Communist press had attacked Hong Kong Governor Chris Patten. The article also noted that Joe Chung was both glad that his article had stirred up debate, but feared for his personal safety as result.
Also according to the article, Ming Pao declined to publish Joe Chung's rebuttal of these attacks, saying that enough had been said on the matter. After the publication of the Sing Tao article, the attacks continued with articles such as "Some 'Chinese People' Who Hate Their Own Country" published in the Ta Kung Pao, on 29 May 2001.

I Don't Want to be Chinese Again
Joe Chung published I Don't Want to be Chinese Again in November 2007, which has  been printed in 55 editions. According to Liberty Times, The book was written in response to the sentiment from "[a] recent online survey of Chinese people found that 65 percent of respondents would prefer not to be Chinese at all". The book severely criticized the Chinese culture.

Donation to Hong Kong Liaison Office

According to media reports, on 16 July 2012, a Hong Kong Legislative Council member, Power to the People lawmaker Albert Chan Wai Yip presented a book by Joe Chung,  "I don't want to be Chinese again", to Zhang Xiaoming, director of China's Liaison Office, as an act of protest against China's central government, before boycotting a lunch meeting at the Legislative Council.

Bibliography

References

 
 
 
 
 
 http://www.libertytimes.com.tw/2011/new/jan/3/today-o6.htm  Liberty Times article on popular reaction to "I Don't Want to be Chinese Again"
http://www.cp1897.com.hk/cpStore_news.php?id=48 Popular Hong Kong book retailer with table of best selling non-fiction books
 http://legalpronews.findlaw.com/photo/02cq3aQ0Qn383   Report via Reuters on a protest against Beijing when Joe Chung's book was donated to CPC rep in Hong Kong.
  Photo of Hong Kong politician donating Chung's book as a political protest

External links
http://joechungvschina.blogspot.com/| Authors blog
http://www.anobii.com/contributors/%E9%8D%BE%E7%A5%96%E5%BA%B7/796317/ Online book site with readers reviews of Chung's books
http://www.books.com.tw/exep/prod/booksfile.php?item=0010387159  Taiwan online book retailer with summary of book 'China Is Stranger Than Fiction'  (中國比小說更離奇), 

Hong Kong writers
Democratic Party (Hong Kong) politicians
1960s births
Living people